Edward G. Dobson (December 30, 1949 – December 26, 2015) was a Northern Irish-American pastor, at one time an executive for the Moral Majority. He became the pastor of a megachurch in Grand Rapids, Michigan and a nationally known author and speaker, especially after being diagnosed with ALS in 2000.

Biography
In 1964, Dobson moved to the United States from Northern Ireland.  He earned a BA (1970) and an MA (1972) from Bob Jones University and an EdD (1986) in higher education from the University of Virginia.  At 23, Dobson became Dean of Men at Liberty University, "but before long he was also teaching New Testament survey, coaching the soccer team, and taking on more administrative duties. In time, Dobson was named vice president for student life as well as associate pastor of Thomas Road Baptist Church." When the Moral Majority was organized in June 1979, Jerry Falwell named Dobson to the board. Three years later, the premiere issue of Fundamentalist Journal listed him as one of two senior editors; he became editor-in-chief two and a half years later and served as a voice of the Moral Majority. Dobson and another Liberty faculty member, Ed Hindson, effectively ghost-wrote Falwell's The Fundamentalist Phenomenon (1981).

By the late 1980s, Dobson had drifted away from fundamentalism toward mainstream evangelicalism and decided that the rationale behind the Moral Majority had been wrongheaded and that to a significant degree cultural problems could not be remedied through the political process. In 1987, Dobson left Liberty (just as Falwell became responsible for the empire of failed televangelist Jim Bakker), and Dobson took the pastorate of Calvary Church in Grand Rapids, Michigan, where he remained for eighteen years (1987–2005). In 1993, Moody Bible Institute named him "Pastor of the Year," and Dobson served as an advisory editor for Christianity Today. While senior pastor of Calvary Church, Dobson mentored a number of young men who had recently entered the ministry or were considering doing so, including Rob Bell, Michael Hidalgo, Jim Samra, Brett Werner, and Marvin Williams. After Dobson's retirement, he mentored others in Grand Rapids.

After Dobson was diagnosed with amyotrophic lateral sclerosis (Lou Gehrig's disease) in 2000, he wrote Prayers and Promises when Facing a Life-Threatening Illness. A short, but widely viewed, video was made of his struggle in illness. In Spring 2008, Grand Rapids Theological Seminary dedicated a "Dobson Study Center" in its classroom building to honor Dobson's long pastorate and television ministry in Grand Rapids.

In January 2009, Dobson was interviewed on Good Morning America because he had attempted to live a year as Jesus had, observing Sabbath and Jewish holidays and festivals. Dobson said that he had voted for Barack Obama on the grounds that Obama "was closer to Jesus's teachings." Some religious conservatives criticized Dobson for occasionally drinking beer while testifying about his Christian faith.

Dobson's son, Kent, became pastor of Mars Hill Bible Church (formerly pastored by Rob Bell, whom Ed Dobson had mentored) but resigned in November 2015, telling the congregation that he was "not drawn to the orthodox or the mainstream or the status quo." In May 2013, Dobson's son Daniel, a U.S. Army veteran of the Iraq war, came out publicly as a gay Christian.

Ed Dobson died on December 26, 2015, aged 65.

Publications 
Abraham: The Lord will Provide (1993)
Blinded by Might (Grand Rapids: Zondervan, 1999) with Cal Thomas
Daniel: Making the Right Choices (1994)
King James Bible Commentary (1999)
The Knowing Jesus Study Bible, NIV (2000) with Ed Hindson
Mastering Conflict and Controversy (1992)
Prayers and Promises When Facing a Life-Threatening Illness (Grand Rapids: Zondervan, 2007)
Starting a Seeker-Sensitive Service (1993)
What the Bible Really Says about Marriage, Divorce, and Remarriage (1986)
The Fundamentalist Phenomenon (1st edition 1980, 2nd edition 1986) with Ed Hindson and Jerry Falwell
The End: Why Jesus Could Return by A.D. 2000 (1997)
 The Year Of Living Like Jesus (2009)
 Seeing through the Fog: Hope When Your World Falls Apart (2012)
Ed's Story (2001 - 2015)''

References

1949 births
2015 deaths
20th-century apocalypticists
20th-century evangelicals
21st-century apocalypticists
21st-century evangelicals
21st-century writers from Northern Ireland
American male writers
American theologians
British theologians
Cornerstone University
Deaths from motor neuron disease
Irish Christian theologians
Male non-fiction writers from Northern Ireland
Neurological disease deaths in Michigan